Andrew Justice (19 January 1951 – 17 June 2005) was a British rower who competed in the 1976 Summer Olympics and in the 1980 Summer Olympics.

In 1976 he was a crew member of the British boat which finished ninth in the quadruple sculls event.

Four years later he won the silver medal with the British boat in the 1980 eights competition.

External links
 profile

1951 births
2005 deaths
British male rowers
Olympic rowers of Great Britain
Rowers at the 1976 Summer Olympics
Rowers at the 1980 Summer Olympics
Olympic silver medallists for Great Britain
Olympic medalists in rowing
Medalists at the 1980 Summer Olympics
World Rowing Championships medalists for Great Britain